Matteo Ingoli (1587–1631) was an Italian painter of the early-Baroque period.

Biography

He was born in Ravenna. He was a pupil of Alvise del Friso and a follower of Paolo Veronese and Palma Giovane, and painted much in Venice. He painted two canvases, the Baptism and Presentation of Mary to temple, for the church of San Lorenzo in Castelli Calepio.

References

1587 births
1631 deaths
16th-century Italian painters
Italian male painters
17th-century Italian painters
Italian Baroque painters
Painters from Venice